The 2022 Toronto FC season was the 16th season in the history of Toronto FC.

Squad
As of August 4, 2022

Roster slots 
Toronto currently has 6+3 international roster slots and three Designated Player slots available for use in the 2022 season. Beginning in 2022, MLS added three non-tradeable international roster spots to the Canadian franchises to compensate for the more complicated residency requirements compared to in the United States; players occupying these additional roster spots are required to have played and been registered with a Canadian MLS club for at least one full year. They traded an international roster spot along with the 2nd spot in the Allocation Order to New York Red Bulls in exchange for $575,000 in General Allocation Money. They traded another international roster spot to Nashville SC along with loaning Jacob Shaffelburg in exchange for $225,000 in General Allocation Money.

Transfers
Note: All figures in United States dollars.

In

Transferred In

Loaned in

MLS SuperDraft picks

Out

Transferred out

Loaned out

Pre-season

Matches

Competitions

Major League Soccer

League tables

Eastern Conference

Overall

Matches

2020 Canadian Championship

2022 Canadian Championship

Competitions summary
{| class="wikitable" style="text-align: center"
|-
!rowspan="2"|Competition
!colspan="8"|Record
!rowspan="2"|First Match
!rowspan="2"|Last Match
!rowspan="2"|Final Position
|-
!
!
!
!
!
!
!
!
|-
| MLS Regular Season

|February 26
|October 9
|13th in Eastern Conference, 27th Overall
|-
| 2020 Canadian Championship

|colspan="2"|June 4
|Champions
|-
| 2022 Canadian Championship

|May 24
|July 26
|Runners-up
|-
! Total

!colspan="4"|

Statistics

Goals 

{| class="wikitable sortable" style="text-align:center;"
|+Goals
!width=15|Rank
!width=15|Nation
!width=130|Player
!width=15|Pos.
!width=50|Major League Soccer
!width=50|MLS Cup Playoffs
!width=50|Canadian Championship
!width=50|Total
|-
|rowspan=2|1||||Jonathan Osorio||MF|| 9 || — || 1 ||10
|-
|||Jesús Jiménez||FW|| 9 || — || 1 ||10
|-
|3||||Federico Bernardeschi||FW|| 8 || — || 0 ||8
|-
|rowspan=2|4||||Lorenzo Insigne||FW|| 6 || — || 0 ||6
|-
|||Alejandro Pozuelo||MF|| 4 || — || 2 ||6
|-
|rowspan=2|6||||Michael Bradley||MF|| 3 || — || 1 ||4
|-
|||Ayo Akinola||FW|| 2 || — || 2 ||4
|-
|8||||Deandre Kerr||MF|| 3 || — || 0 ||3
|-
|rowspan=5|9||||Jayden Nelson||FW|| 1 || — || 0 ||1
|-
|||Ralph Priso||MF|| 1 || — || 0 ||1
|-
|||Kosi Thompson||MF|| 1 || — || 0 ||1
|-
|||Lukas MacNaughton||DF|| 0 || — || 1 ||1
|-
|||Domenico Criscito||DF|| 1 || — || 0 ||1
|-
|colspan="4"|Own goals
| 1 || — || 0 || 1
|- class="sortbottom"
! colspan="4"|Totals||49|| —||8||57

Shutouts 
{| class="wikitable sortable" style="text-align:center;"
|-
!width=15|Rank
!width=15|Nation
!width=130|Player
!width=15|Pos.
!width=50|Major League Soccer
!width=50|MLS Cup Playoffs
!width=50|Canadian Championship
!width=50|Total
|-
|1||||Alex Bono|| GK || 3 || — || 0 ||3
|-
|2||||Quentin Westberg|| GK || 0 || — || 1 ||1
|-
! colspan="4"|Totals||3||—||1||4

References

Notes

External links

Toronto FC seasons
Toronto FC
Toronto FC